A Panthera hybrid is a crossbreed between individuals of any of the five species of the genus Panthera: the tiger, lion, jaguar, leopard, and snow leopard.  Most hybrids would not be perpetuated in the wild as the territories of the parental species do not overlap and the males are usually infertile. Mitochondrial genome research revealed that wild hybrids were also present in ancient times. The mitochondrial genomes of the snow leopard and the lion were more similar to each other than to other Panthera species, indicating that at some point in their history, the female progeny of male ancestors of modern snow leopards and female ancestors of modern lions interbred with male ancestors of modern snow leopards.

History 
In theory, lions and tigers can be matched in the wild and give offspring, but in reality there may be no natural born tigon or liger in the world, because they are separated both geographically, by behavioral differences and lives in different places and do not mate together in the wild. In England, African lions and Asian tigresses have been successfully mated, and three lion-tiger hybrid cubs were born in Windsor in 1824, which is probably the earliest record, the three cubs were then presented to George IV.

Table of names for hybrids
Below are some tables showing the many Panthera hybrids. Panthera hybrids are typically given a portmanteau name, varying by which species is the sire (male parent) and which is the dam (female parent). For example, a hybrid between a lion and a tigress is a liger, because the lion is the male parent and the tigress is the female parent.

Jaguar and leopard hybrids

A jagupard, jagulep or jagleop is the hybrid of a jaguar and a leopardess. A single rosetted female jagupard was produced at a zoo in Chicago (America). Jaguar-leopard hybrids bred at Hellbrun Zoo, Salzburg were described as jagupards, which conforms to the usual portmanteau naming convention.

A leguar or lepjag is the hybrid of a male leopard and a female jaguar. The terms jagulep and lepjag are often used interchangeably, regardless of which animal was the sire. Numerous lepjags have been bred as animal actors, as they are more tractable than jaguars.

A.D. Bartlett  stated: "I have, more than once, met with instances of the male jaguar (P. onca) breeding with a female leopard (P. pardus). These hybrids were also reared recently in Wombell's well-known travelling collection. I have seen some animals of this kind bred, between a male black jaguar and a female Indian leopard:-the young partook strongly of the male, being almost black."

In Barnabos Menagerie (in Spain), a jaguar gave birth to two cubs from a union with a black leopard; one resembled the dam, but was somewhat darker, while the other was black with the rosettes of the dam showing. Since melanism in the panther (leopard) is recessive, the jaguar would have had to have been black, or be a jaguar-black leopard hybrid itself, carrying the recessive gene. Scherren continued, "The same cross, but with the sexes reversed, was noted, by Professor Sacc (F) of Barcelona Zoo (Zoolog. Gart., 1863, 88). "The cub, a female, was grey. She is said to have produced two cubs to her sire; one like a jaguar, the other like the dam. Herr Rorig expressed his regret that the account of the last two cases mentioned lacked fullness and precision."

Female jaguleps or lepjags are fertile, and when one is mated to a male lion, the offspring are referred to as lijaguleps. One such complex hybrid was exhibited in the early 1900s as a "Congolese spotted lion", hinting at some exotic African beast, rather than a man-made hybrid.

Jaguar and lion hybrids

A jaglion or jaguon is the offspring between a male jaguar and a female lion (lioness). A mounted specimen is on display at the Walter Rothschild Zoological Museum, Hertfordshire, England. It has the lion's background color, brown, jaguar-like rosettes and the powerful build of the jaguar.

On April 9, 2006, two jaglions were born at Bear Creek Wildlife Sanctuary, Barrie (north of Toronto), Ontario, Canada. Jahzara (female) and Tsunami (male) were the result of an unintended mating between a black jaguar called Diablo and a lioness called Lola, which had been hand-raised together and were inseparable. They were kept apart when Lola came into oestrus. Tsunami is spotted, but Jahzara is a melanistic jaglion due to inheriting the jaguar's dominant melanism gene. It was not previously known how the jaguar's dominant melanism gene would interact with lion coloration genes.

A liguar is an offspring of a male lion and a female jaguar.

When the fertile offspring of a male lion and female jaguar mates with a leopard, the resulting offspring is referred to as a leoliguar.

Jaguar and tiger hybrids

A tiguar is an offspring of a male tiger and a jaguaress. Reportedly, at the Altiplano Zoo in the city of San Pablo Apetatlan (near Tlaxcala, México), the crossbreeding of a male Siberian tiger and a female jaguar from the southern Chiapas Jungle produced a male tiguar named Mickey. Attempts to verify this report have been bolstered by recent images purported to show the adult Mickey (see External links section). There has been no report of the birth of a  hybrid from a male jaguar and female tiger, which would be termed a "jagger".

There is a claimed sighting of a lion × black jaguar cross (male) and a tiger × black jaguar cross (female) loose in Maui, Hawaii. There are no authenticated tiger/jaguar hybrids and the description matches that of a liger. The alleged tiger × black jaguar was large, relatively long-necked (probably due to lack of a ruff or mane) with both stripes and "jaguar-like" rosettes on its sides. The assertion of hybrid identity was due to the combination of black, dark brown, light brown, dark orange, dark yellow and beige markings and the tiger-like stripes radiating from its face. It is more likely to have been a released liger, since these are very large and have a mix of rosettes (lion juvenile markings) and stripes and can have a brindled mix of colors exactly as described (their markings are extremely variable).

Leopard and lion hybrids

A leopon is the result of breeding a male leopard with a lioness. The head of the animal is similar to that of a lion, while the rest of the body carries similarities to leopards. Leopons are very rare.

A lipard or liard is the proper term for a hybrid of a male lion with a leopardess. It is sometimes known as a reverse leopon. The size difference between a male lion and a leopardess usually makes their mating difficult.

A lipard was born in Schoenbrunn Zoo, Vienna in 1951.

Another lipard was born in Florence, Italy. It is often erroneously referred to as a leopon. The father was a two-year-old, 250-kg lion, 1.08 m tall at the shoulders and 1.8 m long (excluding the tail). The mother was a 3.5-year-old leopardess weighing only 38 kg. The female cub was born overnight on 26/27 August 1982 after an estimated 92–93 days of gestation.

It was born on the grounds of a paper mill near Florence, to a lion and leopardess acquired from a Rome zoo. Their owner had two tigers, two lions and a leopardess as pets, and did not expect or intend them to breed. The lion/leopard hybrid cub came as a surprise to the owner, who originally thought the small, spotted creature in the cage was a stray domestic cat.

The mother began to over-groom the underside of the cub's tail and later bit off its tail. The cub was then hand-reared. The parents mated again in November 1982, and the lion and leopardess were separated.

They were brought together on Jan. 25, 1983 for photographs, but the lion immediately mounted the leopardess and they had to be separated again for fear of endangering her advanced pregnancy.

The cub had the body conformation of a lion cub with a large head (a lion trait), but a receding forehead (a leopard trait), fawn fur and thick, brown spotting. When it reached five months old, the owner offered it for sale and set about trying to breed more.

The male leopon is a fertile offspring of a male leopard and a female lion. The fertile female liguar, offspring of a male lion and female jaguar, is capable of fertilization by a leopon. Their mating, though rare, results in a leopliguar.

Leopard and tiger hybrids

The name dogla is a native Indian name used for a supposedly natural hybrid offspring of a male leopard and a tigress, the combination designated leoger in the table above. Indian folklore claims that large male leopards sometimes mate with tigresses, and anecdotal evidence exists in India of offspring resulting from leopard to tigress matings. A supposed dogla was reported in the early 1900s. Many reports probably refer to large leopards with abdominal striping or other striped shoulders and bodies of a tiger. One account stated, "On examining it, I found it to be a very old male hybrid. Its head and tail were purely those of a panther Indian leopard, but with the body, shoulders, and neck ruff of a tiger. The pattern was a combination of rosettes and stripes; the stripes were black, broad and long, though somewhat blurred and tended to break up into rosettes. The head was spotted. The stripes predominated over the rosettes." The pelt of this hybrid, if it ever existed, was lost. It was supposedly larger than a leopard and, though male, it showed some feminization of features, which might be expected in a sterile male hybrid.

K Sankhala's book Tiger refers to large, troublesome leopards as adhabaghera, which he translated as "bastard", and suggests a leopard/tiger hybrid (the reverse hybrid is unlikely to arise in the wild state, as a wild male tiger would probably kill rather than mate with a female leopard). Sankhala noted there was a belief amongst local people that leopards and tigers naturally hybridise.

From "The Tiger, Symbol Of Freedom", edited by Nicholas Courtney: "Rare reports have been made of tigresses mating with leopards in the wild. There has even been an account of the sighting of rosettes; the stripes of the tiger being most prominent in the body. The animal was a male measuring a little over eight feet [2.44 m]." This is the same description as given by Hicks.

The 1951 book Mammalian Hybrids reported tiger/leopard matings were infertile, producing spontaneously aborted "walnut-sized fetuses".

A tigard is the hybrid offspring of a male tiger and a leopardess. The only known attempts to mate the two have produced stillborns.

In 1900, Carl Hagenbeck crossed a female leopard with a Bengal tiger. The stillborn offspring had a mixture of spots, rosettes and stripes. Henry Scherren wrote, "A male tiger from Penang served two female Indian leopards, and twice with success. Details are not given and the story concludes somewhat lamely. 'The leopardess dropped her cubs prematurely, the embryos were in the first stage of development and were scarcely as big as young mice.' Of the second leopardess there is no mention."

Lion and tiger hybrids

The resulting hybrids that crossbreeding between lions and tigers are known as tigon (/ˈtaɪɡən/) and liger (/ˈlaɪɡə/). The second generation hybrids of liger or tigon are known as liliger, tiliger, litigon and titigon.  The tigon (Panthera tigris X leo), also known as tiglon (/ˈtaɪɡlən/) is an offspring of a male tiger (Panthera tigris) and a female lion (Panthera leo).  A liger is distinct from tigon (Panthera leo X tigris), as a hybrid of female tiger and male lion. In the case a fertile titigon has crossed between a female tigard, the hybrid is rare.

Professor Valentine Bail conducted a long observation and recording of some lion-tiger hybrids, those lion-tiger are owned by Mr. Atkins and his zoo: 

The early record lion-tiger hybrid was mainly tigons, in At Home In The Zoo (1961), Gerald Iles wrote "For the record I must say that I have never seen a liger, a hybrid obtained by crossing a lion with a tigress. They seem to be even rarer than tigons."

Liger
A liger is the offspring between a lion and a tigress, which is larger than its parents because the lion has a growth maximizing gene and the tigress, unlike the lioness, has no growth inhibiting gene.

Tigon
A tigon is the offspring of a tiger and a lioness. The tigon is not as common as the converse hybrid, the liger. Contrary to some beliefs, the tigon ends up smaller than either parent, because male tigers and lionesses have a growth inhibitor. In the late 19th and early 20th centuries, tigons were more common than ligers.

Liliger
A liliger is the offspring of a lion and a ligress. The first known liliger is a cub named Kiara.

Litigon
Rudrani, a tigoness from the Alipore Zoo, mated with Debabrata, a male (reportedly) Asiatic lion (but which was later genetically established as a hybrid of the African and Asiatic subspecies of the lion), and gave birth to three litigons. Only one litigon cub, named Cubanacan, survived.

Tiliger
A tiliger is the offspring of a male tiger and a ligress.

Titigon
A titigon is the offspring of a male tiger and a tigoness.

Growth and size 
Typically, the size of a liger is more likely to be larger and heavier than all of other existing feline animals. Some biologists believe that the causes of its irregular large size, or 'gigantism', result from the lack of certain genes that limit the growth of lions. The male lion's genes tend to maximize the growth of its progeny, as the larger size represents greater competitiveness, so that the male lions could compete with other male lions. In order to control the size of the offspring within a certain range, the gene of the lioness will offset the growth-maximizing gene of the male lion. The genes of a female tiger, however, are not adapted to limiting growth, which allows ligers to grow extremely large—far more larger and heavier than its parent species. According to the Guinness World Records (through 2013), the largest feline was the adult male liger, Hercules, from Myrtle Beach Safari, a wildlife reserve in South Carolina, US.

Tigons too have growth dysplasia, however inversely. A tigon is approximately twice as light as liger.

Unlike ligers, tigons are cross between a male tiger and a female lion, the absence of growth-maximizing genes from the male lion causing them to grow smaller.

Appearance 
Ligers and tigons look just like their parents, only bigger or smaller.  They have huge teeth, about two inches long.  Their genes include the genetic components of tigers and lions, therefore, they may be very similar to tigers and lions, and can be difficult to identify.  Their coloring ranges from gold to brown to white, and they may have or not have spots or stripes. An adult male liger usually has a smaller mane than a male lion.

Longevity 
A liger called Samson died at the age of thirteen in 2006.  Shasta, a female liger, was born in the Hogle Zoo in Salt Lake City in 1948, and died in 1972.  She lived for 24 years.  Many claim that ligers are short-lived, but according to the survey, such a conclusion is still uncertain.  A male tigon owned by Atkins born on July 19, 1833, lived for 10 years.

Fertility 
Guggisberg said liger and tigon were thought to be invariably sterile, which means they cannot have offspring.  The first hybrid of a hybrid (that being a child of liger) was discovered at the Munich-Hellabrunn Zoo in 1943. The birth of the second generation of hybrids has proven that the biologists' knowledge of tigon and liger was wrong; it now seems that only male lion-tiger hybrids are invariably sterile; while female hybrids can give birth as other Panthera animals as well.

Zoo animals 
By 2017 roughly more than 100 ligers were thought to exist, but only a few tigons still exist since they are more difficult to breed. Moreover, ligers are more likely to attract tourists, so zoos prefer to breed ligers as opposed to tigons.

Some zoos claim they breed ligers or tigons for conservation, but opponents believe that it is meaningless to preserve a species that does not exist in the wild.

See also
 Felid hybrid
 Pumapard

References

External links
Hybrid Big Cats.
Detailed information on hybridisation in big cats. Includes tiglons, ligers, leopons and others.
Photograph of Mickey the Tiguar, along with images of other Panthera hybrids (in Spanish) 
Karl Shuker's Tiguar site, containing what may be a video of Mickey the Tiguar

Panthera hybrids